Roman Bohdanovych Barchuk (born 30 January 1990) is a Ukrainian professional footballer who plays as a  forward for Ukrainian club Prykarpattia Ivano-Frankivsk.

References

External links
 Profile on Prykarpattia Ivano-Frankivsk official website
 

1990 births
Living people
Sportspeople from Ivano-Frankivsk
Ukrainian footballers
Association football forwards
FC Sokil Berezhany players
FC Enerhetyk Burshtyn players
FC Beskyd Nadvirna players
FC Karpaty Halych players
FC Prykarpattia Ivano-Frankivsk (1998) players
Ukrainian First League players